Jadhavwadi may refer to:
 Jadhavwadi, Ambegaon, Ambegaon district, Maharashtra, India
 Jadhavwadi, Khanapur, Sangli district, Maharashtra, India
 Jadhavwadi, Mawal, Pune district, Maharashtra, India